The European route E1 in Spain is a series of roads, part of the International E-road network running in two parts through the Southern European country. The first part runs completely through the Autonomous community of Galicia in Northwestern Spain. The E1 arrives from the United Kingdom and the Republic of Ireland by a non-existent ferry route between Rosslare Harbour and Ferrol. From there it runs to the Portuguese border. After crossing Portugal all the way to the south, the E1 starts with the second Spanish part after crossing the border at the Guadiana river. The highway runs only through Andalusia until it ends at the city of Seville.

Route 
The first part starts at the city of Ferrol at the Bay of Biscay. From there it follows the AP-9 motorway passing close by A Coruña before it goes to the capital and pilgrimage destination of Santiago de Compostela. After running through the green hills and passing Pontevedra, it arrives in the largest city of Galicia Vigo. The AP-9 motorway stops at the Autovía A-55 near Tui. Eventually the E1 crosses the border with Portugal on the Minho river. This is one of the most important highways in Galicia as it connects the largest cities on the Atlantic coast. After the Portuguese interruption, the Spanish part of the E1 starts again at the Guadiana river in Ayamonte entering Andalusia. It passes the major city of Huelva following the A-49 until the Andalusian capital Seville. It covers a total distance of 337 km (209 mi) within Spain.

Detailed route

References

International E-road network in Spain